The Big Bay Sloop is the name given to the unidentified remains of a sunken sloop in Lake Superior located off the coast of Madeline Island in La Pointe, Wisconsin, United States. The site was added to the National Register of Historic Places on January 14, 2009. Additionally, it is a designated National Marine Protected Area.

History
The wreck was discovered east of Big Bay State Park in the 1990s. Uncertainty about the identity of the vessel is due to the lack of documentation of small craft on the Great Lakes. The wire rigging and metal cleat on the sloop indicate that it dates from sometime between 1880 and 1920. It is also believed that it was a merchant vessel. The shipwreck is the only known one of its kind in Wisconsin waters.

References

Apostle Islands
Shipwrecks of the Wisconsin coast
Shipwrecks on the National Register of Historic Places in Wisconsin
Shipwrecks of Lake Superior
National Register of Historic Places in Ashland County, Wisconsin